Vladyslav Yuriyovych Kalitvintsev (born 4 January 1993) is a professional footballer who plays as a midfielder for Oleksandriya. Born in Russia, he has represented Ukraine at youth level.

There are instances of his last name (surname) being spelled as Kalytvyntsev due to transliteration issues.

Career

Dynamo Kyiv
He made his debut for Dynamo Kyiv against FC Metalurh Zaporizhya on 9 May 2010. Being only 17 years and 4 months old at his first appearance, he is the youngest player ever to play for Dynamo Kyiv in the Ukrainian Premier League. In the 2014–15 and 2015–16 seasons, he won the Ukrainian Premier League with Kyiv. He also won the Ukrainian Cup in both seasons.

Arsenal Kyiv
In March 2019, he moved to Arsenal Kyiv, where he played 11 matches and scored one goal against Vorskla Poltava.

Desna Chernihiv
In 2019, he signed with Desna Chernihiv. On 15 September, he scored against his former club. He was named Best Player of the Round 7. As a result of the club's 4th place finish in 2019–20, they qualified for the 2020–21 Europa League for the first time in club history.

On 24 September 2020, Kalitvintsev played against VfL Wolfsburg in the Europa League. On 16 February 2021 he extended his contract with Desna Chernihiv until 2023. On 1 May he scored against Kolos Kovalivka.

On 25 July 2021, he scored two goals in a 3–0 victory over Chornomorets Odesa.

On 28 December, Kalitvintsev terminated his contract with Desna Chernihiv, claiming non-payment of his salary.

Oleksandriya
In January 2022, he moved to Oleksandriya in the Ukrainian Premier League for €500,000.

International career
He was part of the Ukraine under-21 side that reached the final of the 2013 Commonwealth of Independent States Cup. He was also part of the side that won the competition the following year. In september 2021, he was called up to the senior side for a friendly against Finland, becoming the first player belong to Desna Chernihiv to been called in the Ukraine national football team.

Personal life
Kalitvintsev is the son of Yuriy Kalitvintsev, a former Ukrainian international and assistant manager.

Outside of professional football
In March 2022, during the Siege of Chernihiv, Kalitvintsev, together with other former Desna players, raised and donated money to the civilian population of the city.

Career statistics

Club

Honours
Dynamo Kyiv
 Ukrainian Premier League: (2) 2014–15 2015–16
 Ukrainian Cup: (2) 2013–14, 2014–15
 Ukrainian Super Cup runners-up: 2013

Ukraine national under-21
Winner (1): Commonwealth of Independent States Cup: 2014
Runner Up (1): Commonwealth of Independent States Cup: 2013

Insividual
 Best Player of November 2021 of Desna Chernihiv

Gallery

References

External links
 Profile on Official website of FC Desna Chernihiv
 Profile on FC Dynamo Kyiv club site (Ukr)
 
 Profile on the Ukrainian Premier League website
 

1993 births
Living people
Footballers from Moscow
Russian emigrants to Ukraine
Ukrainian footballers
FC Dynamo Kyiv players
FC Dynamo-2 Kyiv players
FC Slovan Liberec players
FC Chornomorets Odesa players
FC Zorya Luhansk players
FC Arsenal Kyiv players
FC Desna Chernihiv players
FC Oleksandriya players
Ukrainian Premier League players
Ukrainian First League players
Czech First League players
Ukrainian expatriate footballers
Expatriate footballers in the Czech Republic
Ukrainian expatriate sportspeople in the Czech Republic
Association football midfielders
Ukraine youth international footballers
Ukraine under-21 international footballers
Ukrainian people of Russian descent